This is a list of defunct airlines of Mozambique.

See also

 List of airlines of Mozambique
 List of airports in Mozambique

References

Mozambique
Airlines
Airlines, defunct